Bozağakaraderbendi is a village in the Pülümür District, Tunceli Province, Turkey. The village is populated by Kurds of the Çarekan tribe and had a population of 46 in 2021.

The hamlets of Akçatı, Balpayam, Çağlayan, Çerciler, Ekinözü, Güğümlü, Karaderbent, Karataş, Kolan, Mercimek, Ocaklı, Oğulcuk, Rüstem, Seksenveren, Sungurcuk, Yalıntaş and Yazıcı are attached to the village.

References 

Kurdish settlements in Tunceli Province
Villages in Pülümür District